The 2003 Peace Cup was the first competition of the Peace Cup. The eight invited teams were split into two groups, and two group winners advanced to the final. Champions PSV Eindhoven earned $2 million in prize money.

Teams

Venues

Group stage

Group A

Group B

Final

Goalscorers

References

External links 
 RSSSF

2003
2003
2003 in South Korean football
2003–04 in Turkish football
2003–04 in South African soccer
2003–04 in French football
2003–04 in German football
2003–04 in Dutch football
2003 in Uruguayan football
2003 in American soccer